Md. Abdul Haque is a Bangladesh Nationalist Party politician and the former Member of Parliament of Kushtia-4.

Career
Haque was a Member of the 3rd National Assembly of Pakistan representing Kushtia-1.

Haque was elected to parliament from Kushtia-4 as a Bangladesh Nationalist Party candidate in 1979.

References

Bangladesh Nationalist Party politicians
Living people
2nd Jatiya Sangsad members
Year of birth missing (living people)
Pakistani MNAs 1962–1965
People from Kushtia District